Khoy Thoun (1933–1977) was a Cambodian politician, intellectual and a member of the Central Committee of the Khmer Rouge. He was the Finance Minister of Democratic Kampuchea before being arrested, sent to the infamous S-21 concentration camp and later executed in 1977.

References

1933 births
1977 deaths
Communist Party of Kampuchea politicians
People who died in the Cambodian genocide
Finance ministers of Cambodia 
Executed communists